The Clitumninae are a sub-family of stick insects in the family Phasmatidae found in Asia (a record for Phobaeticus from Brasil was probably erroneous).  The type genus Clitumnus is now considered a synonym of Ramulus.

Tribes and genera
The Phasmida Species File lists three tribes:

Clitumnini
Authority: Brunner von Wattenwyl, 1893
 Baculomia Bresseel & Constant, 2019
 Cuniculina Brunner von Wattenwyl, 1907
 Ectentoria Brunner von Wattenwyl, 1907
 Entoria Stål, 1875
 Erringtonia Brunner von Wattenwyl, 1907
 Gongylopus Brunner von Wattenwyl, 1907
 Lobofemora Bresseel & Constant, 2015
 Mesentoria Chen & He, 2008
 Metentoria Brunner von Wattenwyl, 1907
 Parabaculum Brock, 1999
 Paraentoria Chen & He, 1997
 Paraleiophasma Chen & He, 2008
 Prosentoria Brunner von Wattenwyl, 1907
 Pterulina Bresseel & Constant, 2020
 Ramulus Saussure, 1862
 Rhamphophasma Brunner von Wattenwyl, 1893
 Woodmasonia Brunner von Wattenwyl, 1907

Medaurini

Authority: Hennemann & Conle, 2008
 Cnipsomorpha Hennemann, Conle, Zhang & Liu, 2008
 Interphasma Chen & He, 2008
 Medaura Stål, 1875
 Medauroidea Zompro, 2000
 Medauromorpha Bresseel & Constant, 2017
 Megacnipsomorpha Ho, 2021
 Neomedaura Ho, 2020
 Neosinophasma Ho, 2017
 Neospiniphasma Ho, 2021
 Parapachymorpha Brunner von Wattenwyl, 1893
 Spinoparapachymorpha Ho, 2021

Pharnaciini

Authority: Günther, 1953
 Baculonistria Hennemann & Conle, 2008
 Pharnacia Stål, 1877
 Phobaeticus Brunner von Wattenwyl, 1907
 Phryganistria Stål, 1875
 Tirachoidea Brunner von Wattenwyl, 1893

References

External links
 
 

Phasmatidae
Phasmatodea subfamilies
Phasmatodea of Asia